The 1990 FIBA European Champions Cup Final Four was the 1989–90 season's FIBA European Champions Cup Final Four tournament, organized by FIBA Europe.

Jugoplastika won its second title in a row, after defeating FC Barcelona Banca Catalana in the final game.

Bracket

Semifinals

FC Barcelona – Aris

Jugoplastika – Limoges CSP

Third place game

Final

Awards

FIBA European Champions Cup Final Four MVP 
  Toni Kukoč ( Jugoplastika)

FIBA European Champions Cup Finals Top Scorer 
  Toni Kukoč ( Jugoplastika)

References

External links 
 1989–90 EuroLeague at FIBAEurope.com
 Linguasport

1989–90 in European basketball
1989–90
1989–90 in Greek basketball
1989–90 in Spanish basketball
1989–90 in French basketball
1989–90 in Yugoslav basketball
International basketball competitions hosted by Spain